Aenictus pachycerus is a species of reddish brown army ant found in India, and Sri Lanka.

References

External links

 at antwiki.org

Dorylinae
Hymenoptera of Asia
Insects described in 1858